Francis Lewis (c.1692 – 3 March 1744) of Stanford Hall, Nottinghamshire was an English Member of Parliament.

He was the eldest surviving son of the merchant Thomas Lewes (died 1696) and educated at Trinity College, Oxford, matriculating in 1707 at the age of 15. He also attended New College, Oxford where he was awarded BCL in 1709. He succeeded his grandfather c.1702, inheriting Stanford Hall.

He was appointed High Sheriff of Nottinghamshire for 1713–14 and also returned unopposed as MP for East Retford in a by-election in April 1713 and elected again in a general election later the same year.

He died in 1744 and was buried in Stanford-on-Soar churchyard. He had married Sophia, the daughter of Sir Samuel Dashwood. They had two sons and a daughter. His son Charles succeeded him.

References

 

1744 deaths
People from Rushcliffe (district)
17th-century English people
High Sheriffs of Nottinghamshire
Members of the Parliament of Great Britain for English constituencies
British MPs 1713–1715
British MPs 1710–1713
Alumni of Trinity College, Oxford
Alumni of New College, Oxford
Year of birth unknown
1690s births